Kelcy Quarles (born January 23, 1992) is an American football defensive tackle who is a free agent. He played college football at South Carolina, and was signed by the New York Giants as an undrafted free agent in 2014. Quarles has also been a member of the New England Patriots, Indianapolis Colts, Cleveland Browns, Calgary Stampeders, Edmonton Eskimos, and Saskatchewan Roughriders.

College career
As a junior in 2013, Quarles was a first-team All-Southeastern Conference (SEC) and second-team All-American selection. and was an All-American by Sporting News.

Professional career

New York Giants
On May 10, 2014, Quarles signed with the New York Giants as an undrafted free agent.

New England Patriots
On August 31, 2014, the New England Patriots claimed Quarles off waivers from the Giants.

Indianapolis Colts
On September 16, 2014, the Indianapolis Colts signed Quarles from the New England Patriots practice squad. In his first NFL game he recorded a sack. He was waived on November 24, 2014, and re-signed to the practice squad on November 25. On September 5, 2015, Quarles was waived by the Colts.

New England Patriots (II)
The New England Patriots signed Quarles back to their practice squad on December 2, 2015. They released him on December 15, 2015.

Indianapolis Colts (II)
On December 18, 2015, the Indianapolis Colts announced they had signed Quarles to their practice squad. He was elevated to the active roster on December 21.

On September 3, 2016, he was waived by the Colts as part of final roster cuts. On September 4, 2016, he was signed to the Colts practice squad. Quarles was released on September 13. He was re-signed to the practice squad on October 19, 2016. He was released by the Colts on December 2, 2016. He was re-signed back to the practice squad on December 20, 2016.

Calgary Stampeders
Quarles signed with the Calgary Stampeders of the CFL on January 19, 2018. He was released before the start of the regular season on June 10.

Edmonton Eskimos
Quarles signed a futures contract with the Edmonton Eskimos on November 9, 2018. He spent the 2019 season on the team's practice roster.

Saskatchewan Roughriders
Quarles signed a futures contract with the Saskatchewan Roughriders on November 1, 2019. He was released on February 17, 2021.

Personal life
Quarles is the nephew of Patriots Hall of Fame tight end Ben Coates. It is through his mother, Mattie Quarles (née Coates) that he is related to Ben Coates.

Quarles' father, Buddy Quarles, played for the South Carolina Gamecocks for coach Joe Morrison from 1984-1987 as an offensive lineman.  Quarles initially played as an offensive lineman before switching to defensive around eight grade, however Buddy continued to teach him the tips and tricks of offensive linemen so that he would know what to look for.

References

External links
South Carolina Gamecocks bio

1992 births
Living people
People from Greenwood County, South Carolina
Players of American football from South Carolina
American football defensive tackles
South Carolina Gamecocks football players
New York Giants players
New England Patriots players
Indianapolis Colts players
Cleveland Browns players
Calgary Stampeders players
Edmonton Elks players
Saskatchewan Roughriders players